Lavoine is a commune in the Allier department in central France.

Lavoine may also refer to:
Gilbert Lavoine (1921–1965), French boxer
Marc Lavoine (born 1962), French singer and actor
Sarah Lavoine, French designer and interior designer

See also
 Lamoine (disambiguation)
 Lavoie, a surname